This is a list of public holidays in Vanuatu.

Public holidays

References

Vanuatu
Law of Vanuatu
Holidays
Vanuatu